The Daniel-Johnson dam, formerly known as Manic-5, is a multiple-arch buttress dam on the Manicouagan River that creates the annular Manicouagan Reservoir. The dam is composed of 14 buttresses and 13 arches and is 214 km (133 mi) north of Baie-Comeau in Quebec, Canada. The dam was constructed between 1959 and 1970 for the purpose of hydroelectric power production and supplies water to the Manic-5 and Manic-5-PA power houses with a combined capacity of 2,660 MW. The dam is 214 m (702 ft) tall, 1,314 m (4,311 ft) long and contains 2,200,000 m3 (2,900,000 cu yd) of concrete, making it the largest dam of its type in the world.

The dam was named after Daniel Johnson Sr., the 20th Premier of Quebec, responsible for starting the project while serving as a minister in Duplessis's government. Johnson died on 26 September 1968, the day he was to preside over the scheduled inauguration of the dam. The facility is owned and operated by Hydro-Québec.

Background 

During the summers of 1919 and 1920, hydrological studies were conducted on the Manicouagan and Outardes rivers, flowing into the St. Lawrence near the town of Baie-Comeau. The combined flow was then estimated at 40 million cubic meters, making it one of the largest hydrological systems in Canada. Although harnessing of this potential was considered interesting, its distance from major load centres and the lack of roads in the area were identified as major drawbacks, and building dams in the wilderness was considered too costly.

After the Second World War, the discovery of large iron deposits on the North Shore and the increased forestry activity led to a rapid development of the region. The area's largest cities, Sept-Îles and Baie-Comeau, were now linked to the rest of the province by a road. At the same time, industrial development in southern Quebec required a larger electric supply. Improvements in long-distance electric transmission technologies became significant, with construction of two 315-kilovolt lines, between the Bersimis complex, west of the Manicouagan system, and Montreal, (completed in 1956) lifting another obstacle.

In 1955, Hydro-Québec launched a 5-year extensive assessment of the Manicouagan's suitability. These studies demonstrated the exceptional potential of the river and stressed the advantages of building a multi-dam system in order take full advantage of the terrain and water flows. The data collected at the time was so promising that Hydro-Québec did not wait for the working group to submit their final recommendations. By 1959, a decision was made and construction of a  access road from Baie-Comeau was started. The original project, the Manicouagan-Outardes project, included the construction of five dams on the Manicouagan River (Manic-1, Manic-2, Manic-3, Manic-4 and Manic-5) and three on the Outardes River (Outardes-2, Outardes-3 and Outardes-4). However, a miscalculation prevented the construction of the Manic-4 dam and powerhouse because engineers realized early on that it would encroach on the Manic-3 reservoir.

In 1959, the Premier of Quebec, Maurice Duplessis, wanted a US firm to construct the dam but Quebec's Minister of Water Resources at the time, Daniel Johnson was against the idea. Johnson believed that the skill of a Canadian firm and workers was well suited for the construction of such a complex dam. Duplessis' successor in 1959, Paul Sauvé agreed with Johnson and he continued to pave the way for the dam. Eventually, engineers would choose André Coyne's design for a multiple arch buttress dam as the most suitable and economical.

Construction 
Construction on the dam's support facilities began in 1959 and the river diversion tunnels and foundation preparation commenced in 1960. Workers used "jumbo" drilling platforms and the tunnels progressed  each shift. To facilitate the river's diversion, two cofferdams were built. The first was a concrete arch upstream from the dam site which would block the river, forcing it into the diversion tunnels. The second cofferdam was downstream and prevented water from flowing back into the construction site. Each cofferdam was built on alluvial deposits (loose soil), so they needed to be watertight, which was accomplished with either a grout curtain or deep supporting piles. Once the river was diverted, workers pumped the remaining water out between the two cofferdams in order to prepare the site for construction. This pit was then filled with concrete in the summer of 1962.

After the extensive preparatory works were complete, the first concrete for the dam was poured on October 3, 1962. Concrete was poured day and night, but was halted during the winter because of freezing temperatures. To organize the pouring, the dam was split into  plots and each was raised about five or six feet at a time. Workers had about 150 days — before seasonal flooding — to construct the dam to a height of at least . Before flooding began, engineers planned to seal the diversion tunnels and begin filling the reservoir. To speed the pouring process, concrete was poured in casts by buckets that moved along three cableways suspended above the construction site. The dam was eventually completed in 1968.

Dedication and naming 

On September 25, 1968, the government-owned utility organized a ceremony to mark the completion of the Manicouagan-5 dam. Hundreds of dignitaries, politicians, utility executives, financiers, engineers and journalists were ferried by plane from Montreal, Quebec City and New York to the work-site to attend a banquet and a plaque unveiling ceremony.

Among the guests were Quebec Union Nationale Premier, Daniel Johnson Sr., his predecessor, Jean Lesage, and René Lévesque, the former Hydraulic Resources minister responsible for the consolidation of all investor-owned utilities into Hydro-Québec. Photographs taken at the banquet show the three men were in excellent spirits, holding hands and smiling, although relations between the Liberal leader and his former cabinet minister were strained by Lévesque's recent defection to the Mouvement Souveraineté-Association, a precursor of the Parti Québécois.

In his authorized biography, Hydro-Québec executive Robert A. Boyd recalls being woken up at 6 a.m. the next morning by his boss, Roland Giroux. "I've got bad news, Robert...", said Giroux, adding that he just found the Premier lying dead in his bed. Johnson's sudden demise sent shock waves at the work-site and across the province and the dedication ceremony was quickly cancelled.

On September 26, 1969, a year to the day after Johnson's death, the new Premier Jean-Jacques Bertrand accompanied by Johnson's widow and children, unveiled two plaques and officially dedicated the dam after his predecessor. Both plaques now sit side by side at the top of the complex.

Facilities

Dam 

The design was chosen for strength and economical reasons as it used less concrete or material than a gravity or embankment dam. Pressure from water behind the dam is transferred from the dam's arches to its buttresses and lastly into the ground or its foundation.

The dam was constructed with a high-quality concrete designed to withstand constant thawing and freezing associated with its environment. To further help the structure cope with the climate, engineers placed one-inch steel reinforcing bars within the upstream and downstream faces of the dam. The concrete's strength in compression was initially 4,500 lbs. per square inch to meet an estimated 1,500 PSI within the structure. The upstream face of the dam was also coated in asphalt for protection against water. Despite the strength of the dam's concrete, two parallel inclined cracks were discovered on one of the arches shortly after construction.

Reservoir 

The dam impounded the Manicouagan River, which filled the Earth's fifth largest confirmed impact structure, the Manicouagan impact structure, creating Manicouagan Reservoir. Coincidentally, the reservoir itself is the fifth largest in the world as well.

The reservoir is a well known area for Atlantic salmon, lake trout and northern pike fishing, although tall trees flooded during the impoundment have not decomposed due to a lack of oxygen, which can sometimes interfere with the sport.

The priming of the reservoir also created a large artificial island in the centre of the Manicouagan reservoir by merging two crescent-shaped lakes: Mouchalagane Lake on the western side and Manicouagan Lake on the eastern side.

The island was named after René Levasseur, the chief engineer responsible for the construction of the Daniel-Johnson dam. Levasseur died at the age of 35, only days before the dam's inauguration.

Powerhouses 

The dam fuels two powerhouses, the Manic-5 and Manic-5-PA.

The designers of the Manic-5 decided on an above ground power house that was downstream of the dam for safety and cost. The intake was built on the east side of the dam and supplies two , long  diameter concrete-lined penstocks (tunnels). Just before reaching the power house and its eight turbines, each penstock splits into four branches. Each surge tank has an  diameter expansion chamber and is about  higher than the actual dam structure. The surge tanks protect the penstocks and turbines from water hammer which would occur if the turbine gates were quickly closed and water pressure suddenly increases.

Cultural and political significance 

The construction of the Daniel-Johnson Dam and the Manic-Outardes complex happened in a larger social and political context of the Quiet Revolution in Quebec, a time when recently nationalized "Hydro-Québec rapidly becomes a symbol of the new Quebec nationalism and of the new economic strategy of the State", explains historian Paul-André Linteau.

This newfound euphoric attitude is found in newspapers of the period. In a series of papers published in Montreal's La Presse, Renaude Lapointe calls Hydro-Québec a "colossus on the march". In this context, the construction of the complex is closely followed by the public and becomes part of the popular culture of that era.

For instance, chansonnier Georges Dor penned his 1966 hit song, La Manic, which tells the story of a construction worker at the remote jobsite who describes his loneliness to his wife in words that captured the collective imagination of the Quebec public.

Belgian-born novelist Henri Vernes was also inspired by the gigantic project and made the Manic-5 project the setting of one of his Bob Morane adventure novels. Terreur à la Manicouagan is about an attempt by arch-villain Roman Orgonetz to breach the dam by destroying the surge chamber by remote-controlled detonation, a plan foiled by Morane and his Scottish sidekick, Bill Ballantine. Prior to writing his novel, Vernes spent some time at the worksite, at the invitation of the Quebec government and Hydro-Québec. The book was launched in 1965 at the Hydro-Québec Building in Montreal.

Other notable visitors to the construction site included cartoonist Hergé, who left an original drawing of his characters Tintin the reporter and his dog Snowy posing in front of a ligne claire depiction of the dam.

The hydroelectric project also gave its name to Montreal's first foray into professional soccer, the short-lived Montreal Manic. The franchise competed for three seasons in the North American Soccer League in the early 1980s. In March 2000, the Canada Post Corporation issued a 46 cent stamp featuring the Dam as part of a 4-stamp Millennium Collection sheet depicting "engineering and technological marvels".

Guided tours

The dam is also a tourist attraction. Since the 1960s, Hydro-Québec organizes four daily tours of the facility between June 24, Quebec's National Day, and August 31. Off-season tours can also be arranged by appointment. The two-hour tour includes a briefing on the construction and operation of the facility, a visit of the Manic-5 powerhouse and a bus ride to the base and the crest of the dam, which has a view of the Manicouagan River valley. A lookout five minutes away by car is a popular picnic spot, with a view of the dam, which is lit at night.

Although picture-taking is allowed in the visitor centre and outside, cameras have been banned inside the powerhouses since a Radio-Canada television crew entered the unguarded Manic-5-PA and Robert-Bourassa powerhouses in February 2005. The incident led to the resignations of Hydro-Québec's CEO André Caillé, and chairman of the Board André Bourbeau, less than two months later.

The dam is about three hours' drive from Baie-Comeau along narrow, winding Route 389. Hydro-Québec reported 8,217 visitors in 2009.

See also 

 List of largest power stations in Canada
 List of conventional hydroelectric power stations
 Hydro-Québec's electricity transmission system
 Jean-Lesage generating station
 René-Lévesque generating station

Notes

References

Further reading 
 
 .
 
 
 .

External links

 

 3D model

Manicouagan-Outardes hydroelectric project
Dams in Quebec
Buttress dams
Arch dams
Dams completed in 1970
Dams on the Manicouagan River
Energy infrastructure completed in 1970
1970 establishments in Quebec
Publicly owned dams in Canada